Big Gigantic are an American instrumental electronic hip hop and jazz musical duo based in Boulder, Colorado.

The band have played at a wide range of music festivals, including Coachella Valley Music and Arts Festival, Lollapalooza, Ultra Music Festival, Hangout Music Festival, Austin City Limits, Governors Ball Music Festival, Electric Forest Festival, Outside Lands and Bonnaroo, among others. Since 2012, Big Gigantic has sold out their festival Rowdytown at Red Rocks Amphitheatre each September in Morrison, Colorado. 

Big Gigantic has toured the US numerous times and has played live shows in Europe, South America, India, and Japan.

Releases 
In 2016, Big Gigantic released their album Brighter Future, with tracks featuring hip hop artists including Waka Flocka Flame and Logic, singers Jennifer Hartswick, Rozes, Angela McCluskey and Natalie Cressman, as well as collaborations with GRiZ and Cherub. The album debuted at number two on the Billboard Dance/Electronic Albums chart.

On February 28, 2020, Big Gigantic released their seventh album Free Your Mind, with a 26-date tour beginning in March. 

Big Gigantic albums, mixes, remixes, and singles are free to download on their website.

Appearances 
Big Gigantic's music has been licensed extensively including: Apple's MacBook Pro reveal in October 2016, sports coverage of Wimbledon, NASCAR,  the NBA, ET's 'The Bachelor', Fox's Empire, Dancing with the Stars, the Valerian trailer, and the Dirty Grandpa trailer.

Side Projects
Gigantic Underground Conspiracy

The duo are part of jam band/electronica supergroup Gigantic Underground Conspiracy, composed of members from Big Gigantic, the Disco Biscuits, and Underground Orchestra. The group have played live shows.

Big Grizmatik

The duo are part of Big Grizmatik, together with GRiZ and Gramatik.

Members
 Dominic Lalli – saxophone/producer
 Jeremy Salken – drums

Lalli holds a master's degree from the Manhattan School of Music, and Salken has been a touring musician, including with the Victor Barnes Bluegrass Band, which is currently on hiatus.

Discography 
Studio albums
 Fire It Up (1320 Records, 2009)
 Wide Awake (1320 Records, 2009)
 A Place Behind the Moon (1320 Records, 2010)
 Nocturnal (1320 Records, 2012)
 The Night Is Young (Big Gigantic Records, 2014)
 Brighter Future (Big Gigantic Records, 2016)
 Brighter Future Remixed (Big Gigantic Records, 2017)
 Brighter Future Deluxe (Big Gigantic Records, 2017)
 Free Your Mind (Counter Records, 2020)
 Brighter Future 2 (Big Gigantic Records, 2022)

Extended plays
 Leisure Season (2021)

Singles
 "The World Is Yours" (2011)
 "Power" (with Griz) (2012)
 "Colorado Mountain High" (2013)
 "Love Letters" (feat. Sabina Sciubba) (2014)
 "Funk With Me & Funk With Me VIP" (with Snails) (2015)
 "Good Times Roll" (with Griz) (2015)
 "Get On Up" (2015)
 "$4,000,000" (Steve Aoki and Bad Royale featuring Ma$e and Big Giganic) (2017)
 "Better Believe It Now" (with Gramatik) (2019)
 "You're the One" (featuring Nevve) (2019)
 "Friends" (2019) (featuring Ashe)
 "Where I Wanna Be" (2019)
 "Burning Love" (2020)
 "St. Lucia" (2020)
 "I Can Feel It" (2021)
 "Daily Routine" (GRiZ featuring Big Giganic and Probcause) (2021)
 "Open Your Mind" (with GRiZ) (2022)

Remixes
 Petit Biscuit — "Parachute" (Big Gigantic Remix) (2021)

References

External links
 

American instrumental musical groups
Electronic music groups from Colorado
American musical duos
Electronic music duos